The Marsien is a sports car produced by Marc Philipp Gemballa GmbH based on the Porsche 992 Turbo S.

Overview
Marc Philipp Gemballa, the son of Uwe Gemballa, who founded a tuning company in 1981, presented as managing director of Marc Philipp Gemballa GmbH the Marsien, a sports car limited to 40 off-road vehicles in July 2021. It had its public premiere a month later as part of Monterey Car Week. The car is inspired by the rally version of the Porsche 959. In its normal state, the Marsien has a ground clearance of 12 centimetres, but this can be hydraulically increased to 25 centimeters in off-road mode. The chassis is a custom-made product specially developed for the vehicle KW Automotive . It has a double wishbone suspension at the front and a multi-link suspension at the rear. The vehicle is named after the red sand deserts in the United Arab Emirates, where the Marsien was tested as a Project Sandbox. The development team reminded these deserts of the surface of the planet Mars.

Specifications
The Marsien is powered by the 3.7-liter boxer engine that came from the 911 Turbo S, which has been upgraded to 551 kW (750 hp) by Ruf Automobile.

References

Cars introduced in 2022
Cars of Germany
Sports cars
Coupés
All-wheel-drive vehicles
Rear-engined vehicles
Cars powered by boxer engines